Anything More Would Be Greedy is a six-part television comedy-drama miniseries was written and created by Malcolm Bradbury and directed by Rodney Bennett, this series was produced by Anglia Television for the ITV Network, first aired on ITV from 26 July to 30 August 1989. The drama was narrated by Simon Cadell and it stars Martin Wenner, Sharon Holm, Alison Sterling, Robert Bathurst, Tessa Peake-Jones, Matthew Marsh and Christopher Benjamin. The series begins as the story of a group of Cambridge students and their lives in the ten years following their graduation.

Cast
 Simon Cadell as Narrator
 Martin Wenner as Peter Vickery
 Sharon Holm as Anna Golan / Anna Wynant
 Alison Sterling as Lynn Hart
 Robert Bathurst as Dennis Bedlam
 Tessa Peake-Jones as Jonquil Vickery / Jonquil Harmer
 Matthew Marsh as Mark Golan
 Christopher Benjamin as Eric Harmer
 Michael J. Shannon as Toby Dehring
 Maryann Turner as Mrs. Harmer
 Shaun Curry as Group Captain Maclehose
 Peter Gale as Dr. Franz Stubli
 Shaughan Seymour as Henry Major
 Geoffrey Beevers as Alan Nuttall
 Paul Shearer as Dave Hall
 James Villiers as Lord Fyson
 Peter Woodward as Felix Gould
 Stephen Fry as Julian Holmes-Coppitt
 Paul Brooke as Mr. Leadweller
 Hilary Drake as Leah Gould

Episodes
"Enigma Variations" (26 July 1989)
"Trading Favours" (2 August 1989)
"Playing Games" (9 August  1989)
"Realizing Assets" (16 August 1989)
"Second Term" (23 August 1989)
"Georgian Silver" (30 August 1989)

Filming locations
The television series was set in Cambridge, Cambridgeshire.

References

External links

1989 British television series debuts
1989 British television series endings
1980s British drama television series
ITV television dramas
British comedy-drama television shows
1980s British television miniseries
Television series by ITV Studios
Television shows produced by Anglia Television
English-language television shows
Television shows set in Cambridgeshire